Laharighat Assembly constituency is one of the 126 assembly constituencies of Assam Legislative Assembly. Laharighat forms part of the Nowgong Lok Sabha constituency.

Members of Legislative Assembly

Election results

2021 result

2016 result

1952 By-election

References

External links 
 

Assembly constituencies of Assam